Francis Piasecki (28 July 1951 – 6 March 2018) was a French professional football midfielder.

References

External links
 
 
Profile at FFF.fr 
Profile at racingstub.com
FC Metz website

1951 births
2018 deaths
Footballers from Grand Est
French people of Polish descent
French footballers
France international footballers
Association football midfielders
FC Metz players
Valenciennes FC players
FC Sochaux-Montbéliard players
Paris Saint-Germain F.C. players
RC Strasbourg Alsace players
Ligue 1 players
French football managers
RC Strasbourg Alsace managers
Sportspeople from Moselle (department)